Harry Ernest Bowdler also known as Ernie Bowdler (1872 – 24 May 1921) was a Welsh footballer. He was part of the Wales national football team, playing 1 match on 18 March 1893 against Scotland.

Personal and professional life
Bowdler was born in 1872, son of John Charles Bowdler, a Shrewsbury solicitor, and educated at Shrewsbury School, attending from 1887 to 1893. John Charles Henry Bowdler (aka Jack), also a Wales international, was his brother.

He became a solicitor, working with his brother Jack's offices at Swan Hill, Shrewsbury. He was Assistant Overseer of the parishes of St Chad and St Alkmund in Shrewsbury as well as the neighbouring rural parishes of Uffington, Withington and Battlefield.

He died after an appendicitis operation in a Shrewsbury nursing home on 24 May 1921 aged 48 and was buried in Shrewsbury General Cemetery in Longden Road on 27 May. His home at time of his death was at Villa Nova, Sutton Road. He was survived by a wife and one daughter.

Playing career
While at Shrewsbury School Bowdler played in the school football XI.

At the same period he with his brother was one of the formative players in the Shrewsbury Town team after the club's foundation in 1886 but unlike him did not play in the Football League competitions.

He was the unexpected cause of one unusual incident at a Shrewsbury Town home match to a visiting team from St George's in playing for the Shropshire League Cup in March 1893. During the second half the visiting team's right-back defender kicked out at Bowdler; this sparked a pitch invasion when Bowdler's father got up from among the spectators to remonstrate with the errant player, and caused the match to be called off 15 minutes before time.

See also
 List of Wales international footballers (alphabetical)

References

External links
 

1872 births
1921 deaths
Shrewsbury Town F.C. players
Sportspeople from Shrewsbury
Welsh footballers
Wales international footballers
Place of birth missing
Association football forwards